Yes is the third contemporary worship music album originally released in the U.S. with worship leader Alvin Slaughter by Integrity/Hosanna! Music. The album was recorded live at New Song Christian Fellowship in Brentwood, Tennessee pastored by Dale Evrist, and released in 1997. The former Brooklyn Tabernacle lead vocalist draws on his gospel roots for twelve new arrangements of choral material including "Mercy Refused," "Worthy Worthy," "Jesus Is Mine" and nine other tracks.

Track listing
Jesus You Are Welcome - 4:32
God Is Good - 4:44
Move in This Place - 4:04
Mercy Refused - 4:25
Allelujah, Praise Jehova - 4:42
A Servant's Prayer - 3:26
I Need Thee Every Hour - 3:02
He's Already Provided - 3:52
Worthy Worthy - 3:52
Medley: Yes, Lord, Yes//Yes - 5:20
Midnight Cry - 7:09
Jesus Is Mine - 4:28

Credits
Producers:
 Dave Williamson
 Scott Williamson

Executive Producer:
 Chris Long

Arrangers:
 Chris McDonald
 Dave Williamson
 Scott Williamson

A&R Director::
 Chris Thomason

Worship Leader:
 Alvin Slaughter

Liner Notes:
 Michael Coleman
 Alvin Slaughter

Musicians:
 Scott Williamson - Drums
 Mark Baldwin - Guitar
 Jeff Bailey - Trumpet
 Pat Coil - Keyboards, Synthesizer
 Mark Douthit - Saxophone
 Eric Darken - Percussion
 Chris McDonald - Trombone
 Jim Hammerly - Acoustic and Electric Piano
 Mike Haynes - Trumpet
 Jackie Street - Bass
 Steven Ford - Synthesizer, Keyboards, Organ (Hammond)

Vocals (Background): 
 Tim Davis
 Sherry Carter - Soloist
 Marcia Ware - Soloist

Choir:
 "New Song Christian Fellowship Choir"
 Dave Williamson - Director

Special Guest Appearance:
 "The New Song Kids Choir"
 Frank Hernandez - Director
 Leslie Tayman - Director

Engineers: 
 Paul Mills - Mixing
 Scott Williamson - Overdub Engineer
 Hank Williams - Mastering
 Randy Poole - Overdub Engineer
 David Schober - Remote Engineer
 Howard Steele - Remote Recording Engineer
 Sandra Johnson - Production Assistant

1997 live albums
Alvin Slaughter albums